TSG Thannhausen is a German association football club located in Thannhausen, Bavaria.

Overview

TSG Thannhausen traces its earliest origins as an organization to 1862, first as a gymnastics club and then later as a gymnastics club and fire brigade as required by local bylaw. The club's recognized founding date is 1890, with the football section established in the 1920s. The association collapsed in 1943 due to the pressures brought on by World War II, but was re-established after the conflict on 14 July 1947.

Thannhausen was one of the few teams below the third division to qualify for the 2006–07 DFB-Pokal. The club played host to Bundesliga giants Borussia Dortmund in a first round cup match, losing 3–0. Their only previous appearance in the DFB-Pokal was a 6–0 defeat to Bayer Leverkusen in the first round in 1975.

For most of its history, the club existed in the lower levels of the Schwaben league system, its only bright moments being back-to-back Schwaben Cup wins in 1974 and 1975. In 1965 and 1971, the club achieved promotion from the A-Klasse to the Bezirksliga, from 1971 onwards the club always stayed in the Bezirksliga or higher. In 1984 and 1985, the club came close to promotion to the Landesliga, both years losing the promotion deciders.

The club made a single season appearance in the Landesliga Bayern-Süd (V) in 1990–91 before returning to fifth-tier play in 2001, being relegated to the Bezirksoberliga Schwaben. The next decade saw the club moving between Bezirksoberliga and Bezirksliga, before regaining its Landesliga status in 2001, for two more seasons, before being relegated again. The club bounced right back however, winning its third promotion to the Landesliga in 2004. After a second place Landesliga result in 2007, Thannhausen advanced to the Bayernliga (IV) for the first time, winning the promotion round, becoming the 99th team to play in this league since 1963. A series of good results in spring 2008 put TSG in contention for promotion to the Regionalliga Süd, the excellent seventh-place finish at the end of season was, however, not quite good enough to archive this. After two good seasons in the league, 2009–10 proved unsuccessful, with the team finishing 18th and being relegated back to the Landesliga. After four seasons in the Landesliga TSG suffered another relegation, now to the Bezirksliga. A last-place finish in 2015–16 caused the club to be relegated once more, now to the Kreisliga. A title in 2018 bounced TSG back to the Bezirksliga.

In addition to its football side, the current day sports club boasts over 1,100 members with departments for athletics, gymnastics, table tennis, volleyball, and winter sports.

Honours
The club's honours:

League
 Kreisliga Schwaben (VIII)
 Champions: 2018
 Landesliga Bayern-Süd (V)
 Runners-up: (2) 2006, 2007
 Bezirksoberliga Schwaben (V-VI)
 Champions: 1990
 Runners-up: (2) 2001, 2004
 Bezirksliga Schwaben-Nord
 Champions: (2) 1989, 1998

Cup
 Bavarian Cup
 Winners: 2006
 Schwaben Cup
 Winners: (3) 1974, 1975, 2006
 Runners-up: (2) 1984, 2005

Recent seasons
The recent season-by-season performance of the club:

With the introduction of the Bezirksoberligas in 1988 as the new fifth tier, below the Landesligas, all leagues below dropped one tier. With the introduction of the Regionalligas in 1994 and the 3. Liga in 2008 as the new third tier, below the 2. Bundesliga, all leagues below dropped one tier. With the establishment of the Regionalliga Bayern as the new fourth tier in Bavaria in 2012 the Bayernliga was split into a northern and a southern division, the number of Landesligas expanded from three to five and the Bezirksoberligas abolished. All leagues from the Bezirksligas onward were elevated one tier.

DFB Cup appearances
The club has qualified for the first round of the German Cup twice:

Source:

References

External links
Official team site

Association football clubs established in 1890
Football clubs in Germany
Football clubs in Bavaria
Football in Swabia (Bavaria)
1890 establishments in Germany